Aporrectodea rosea, the rosy-tipped worm, is a species of earthworm commonly found in Europe especially in Ukraine.

References

Lumbricidae
Fauna of Ukraine
Animals described in 1826
Taxa named by Marie Jules César Savigny